Malher S.A. is a Guatemala City food products and beverages company; it offers a variety of products in all Central America and the Caribbean region. Malher's products include food seasoning, canned food, and fruit-flavored soft drinks. The name "Malher" comes from the words, "Maldonado Hermanos", which means Maldonado brothers. Miguel Ángel named it after his two brothers, Jorge Efrain and Max.

It was founded on July 21, 1957 by Miguel Ángel Maldonado, his brother Jorge Efrain, and his wife, María García de Maldonado, with the latter running the company after her husband's death in 1972, at the age of 46.

External links
The Malher website 

Food and drink companies of Guatemala
Guatemalan brands